Kuttram Kadithal is a 2015 Tamil-language independent drama film written and directed by Bramma in his debut, and produced by J. Satish Kumar and Christy Siluvappan under the JSK Film Corporation and Chris Pictures banner. It features Master Ajay, Radhika Prasidhha, Sai Rajkumar, and Pavel Navageethan.

The film explores a spectrum of lifestyles and how one unexpected incident influences people from diverse backgrounds. The title of the film is derived from the 44th adhikaaram (chapter) of the Thirukkural, where Thiruvalluvar alludes to avoiding mistakes.

Kuttram Kadithal was released on 24 September 2015. Ahead of its theatrical release, it had been screened at various film festivals and won the National Film Award for Best Feature Film in Tamil.

Cast 
 Master Ajay as Chezhiyan
 Radhika Prasidhha as Merlin
 Sai Rajkumar as Manikandan
 Pavel Navageethan as Udayan
 Kulothungan Udayakumar as Thanikachalam
 Sathya Sachu as Chezhiyan's mother
 Durga Venugopal as Radha
 Dhanpat Jain as Dhanpat Jain (Doctor)
 Nikhila Kesavan as Padmavathi (Science teacher)
 Birender Shingvi as Sardar friend

Production
Bramma stated that he had conceived the story for his debut film only after he decided he wanted to be a filmmaker. Christy Selvappan, a media manager with the Qatar-based TV channel Al Jazeera and an old friend of Bramma, made the offer to produce the film. The two decided to make a film that should have "universal appeal". Bramma said, "We started off on a small scale and knew that content was our trump card. We wanted every single person who watched our film to be able to relate to the incident in the story. We wanted to make sure that the film will be remade in other languages, at least in other Indian languages". He also said that the incident showcased in the film was not a real-life one although it was inspired by a number of similar incidents that have happened in the country, while disclosing that it had to with "schooling in particular and education in general".

Bramma chose Radhika Prasidhha, a theatre artiste, writer and director, to portray the lead role after he had seen a web series that she had done. Other pivotal roles were given to Pavel Navageethan, a writer and theatre artiste who has also directed at least 10 short films; Sai Rajkumar, a film student; and Master Ajay, a 12-year-old stage actor from a government home. The film was shot in 120 locations throughout Chennai, over 52 days with a shoestring budget of ₹1.5 crore (worth ₹2.6 crore in 2021 prices).

Release

Critical reception
Sify wrote, "it's a simple film but the sublime detailing and exemplary execution provides us a lifetime movie watching experience and undoubtedly, Kuttram Kadithal is one of the best films ever made in Tamil cinema. To be honest, we have a cult classic here". Behindwoods.com gave 3.5 stars out of 5 and wrote, "Kuttram Kadithal is one such film which doesn't while away 2 hours of your time. It tells you how you should spend the rest of the hours left to live". Rediff gave 3.5 stars out of 5 as well, calling it an "intense drama that questions the adequacy of our school system" and a "brilliant team effort that hits you hard". Silverscreen.in wrote, "There's something in this too-perfect film that leaves you aching. It has an intelligent and compelling storyline. Well-written dialogues, unseasoned, yet terrific actors, and brilliant technicians amply support the film. But in the end, you find yourself searching for the thorn that pricked your feet. While you were walking through a soft, lush lawn. Mesmerised". Indiaglitz.com gave 4 out of 5 and wrote, "Kuttram Kadithal is a must watch film that bears testimony to the standards of National Awards given to films in India". G. Dhananjayan in his book Pride of Tamil cinema - 1931 to 2013 wrote "Overall, the film deserves watching by every school, teacher, student and parent for its theme".

Baradwaj Rangan wrote, "Up to a point, Bramma exhibits superb control. His reveals are slow; he trusts the audience. The actors are marvellous....And Bramma is careful not to take sides...But somewhere in the second half, Bramma loses his grip and runs out of things to do. He keeps delaying the inevitable...and we keep killing time with a koothu performance and a detour at a shady-looking lodge".

Accolades
 National Film Award for Best Feature Film in Tamil
 Tamil Nadu State Award for Best Film 2014 
 Best Tamil film Award at 12th Chennai International Film Festival
 Sri SankaraDoss Swamigal Award, Government of Pondichery

 Film Festivals
Kuttram Kadithal was screened at around various national and international film festivals. It was chosen to be screened at the 16th Mumbai Film Festival, where it competed with four other films in 'The New Faces of Indian Cinema' category. It was the only Tamil film chosen to compete in the 16th Zimbabwe International Film Festival. It was also the only Tamil film selected for the Indian Panorama section of the 45th International Film Festival of India.

Parallel Digital Release
In a first for Tamil cinema, Kuttram Kadithal was released through online portals, such as HeroTalkies.com and Tentkotta.com, just three days after its main theatrical release in India. As there was  no overseas theatrical release, a legal online release gives the producers of the movie an additional source of income.

References

External links

Bibliography

2015 films
Films about the education system in India
2010s Tamil-language films
Best Tamil Feature Film National Film Award winners
2015 directorial debut films